William Bell (1591–24 February 1624) was an East India Company (EIC) factor in the city of Isfahan, the royal capital of Safavid Iran, during the reign of Safavid Shah Abbas the Great (1688-1629). He came to Iran in 1616 during the reign of English King James I on board the barge James, carrying the EIC's first trial shipment of goods to Iran, and he was the first to disembark when the ship anchored at Jask. The records of the EIC note that he died "after a seven nights sore visitation with a burning fever". Bell's funeral, according to the same records, was attended by "Hollanders and such Franks as were resident, but likewise with Cogiah Nazer and other the principal of the Armenians, with all their churchmen... and at least 5000 Julfalines and other Xpians". Bell's grave, located at the New Julfa Armenian Cemetery, is the oldest known British grave in Iran. The headstone is inscribed in Latin.

References

1624 deaths
British East India Company people
Burials in Isfahan
British expatriates in Iran
Safavid Iran
1591 births